Imad Ghazi Al Miri (born 10 September 1977) is a Lebanese football coach and former player who is assistant coach of  club Ahli Saida. As a player, he played as a full-back or midfielder.

Club career 
On 13 September 2004, Al Miri moved to Ansar from Olympic Beirut. He retired on 30 September 2020.

Managerial career 
On 5 August 2021, Al Miri was appointed head coach of Ahli Saida.

Honours

Player 
Shabab Sahel
 Lebanese FA Cup: 1999–2000; runner-up: 2012–13
 Lebanese Challenge Cup: 2014

Tadamon Sour
 Lebanese FA Cup: 2000–01

Olympic Beirut
 Lebanese Premier League: 2002–03
 Lebanese FA Cup: 2002–03

Ansar
 Lebanese Premier League: 2005–06, 2006–07
 Lebanese FA Cup: 2005–06, 2006–07
 Lebanese Elite Cup runner-up: 2005

Safa
 Lebanese Premier League: 2011–12, 2015–16
 Lebanese Elite Cup runner-up: 2011, 2015
 Lebanese Super Cup runner-up: 2011

Shabab Arabi
 Lebanese Second Division: 2016–17

Individual
 Lebanese Premier League Team of the Season: 2001–02, 2004–05, 2009–10, 2010–11

References

External links
 
 
 
 
 

1977 births
Living people
Footballers from Beirut
Lebanese footballers
Association football fullbacks
Association football midfielders
Shabab Al Sahel FC players
Tadamon Sour SC players
Olympic Beirut players
Al Ansar FC players
Racing Club Beirut players
Safa SC players
Al Shabab Al Arabi Club Beirut players
Al Ahli Saida SC players
Lebanese Premier League players
Lebanese Second Division players
Lebanon international footballers
Lebanese football managers
Al Ahli Saida SC managers
Lebanese Second Division managers